The 2006 AFC U-19 Women's Championship qualification was qualification section of 2006 AFC U-19 Women's Championship.

North Zone
All matches were held at Chinese Taipei

East Zone
All matches were held at Thailand

South Zone
All matches were held at India

West Zone
All matches were held at Jordan 

Jordan won group on a coin toss.

Qualified Teams
Automatically qualified
 (2004 Champions)
 (2004 Runners-up)
 (2004 Third place)
 (Hosts)

Qualified Teams

External links
RSSSF.com

AFC U-19 Women's Championship qualification
qualification
2006 in youth sport